César Alejandro Farías Acosta (born 7 March 1973) is a Venezuelan football manager, currently in charge of Ecuadorian club Aucas.

Farías is known for having coached Deportivo Táchira, Mineros de Guayana, Deportivo Anzoátegui and the Venezuelan U-20 team. He is the first and only manager to ever have taken Venezuela to the semi-final stage of the Copa America. In 2009, he was in charge of Venezuela's U-20 team as it qualified for the first time in its history to the FIFA U-20 World Cup.

Managerial career

Early career
Farías was born in Guiria. In 1998, he started his managerial career in Nueva Cádiz FC; that same year, his team went on to win the  Venezuelan Segunda División. In 2002, he had his debut in the Venezuelan Primera División as the manager of Trujillanos FC. In 2003, he was appointed coach of Deportivo Táchira. In 2005, he was fired by the administrative board of Deportivo Tachira but was then hired, shortly after, by Mineros de Guayana.

In 2007, after having had a very good season with Mineros de Guayana, he was hired by Deportivo Anzoátegui. That same year, the team went on to finish first within the Venezuelan Primera Division.

Venezuelan national U-20 football team

In April 2008, he was appointed coach of the Venezuelan U-20 team. The team went on to qualify for the first time ever to the FIFA U-20 World Cup in 2009.

Venezuela national football team
On November 26, 2007, the Venezuelan Football Federation announced the departure of Richard Páez as coach of the Venezuela national football team. After weeks of negotiations with several coaches, the Venezuelan Football Federation officially announced that Farías would replace Páez as coach.

On February 3, 2008, Farías debuted as coach of the Venezuela national team with a 1–0 win over Haiti. Several months later, on June 6, during a friendly match in preparation for the FIFA World Cup qualification, Venezuela defeated  Brazil for the first time in its history with a final score of 2–0.

On June 14, 2008, Farías debuted in the FIFA World Cup qualifiers with a 1–1 draw against Uruguay at the Estadio Centenario of Montevideo. He nearly achieved qualification to the 2010 FIFA World Cup, after finishing only two points away from a highly disputed 5th place qualification spot.

In the 2011 Copa América held in Argentina, he became the second coach to ever guide Venezuela to the knockout stages of the tournament. He saw his team advance to the knockout stages following draws with Brazil (0–0) and Paraguay (3–3) and a victory over Ecuador (1–0). He also became the first coach to take Venezuela to the semi-final stage of the Copa America after his team defeated Chile 2–1 in the quarter finals.

Tijuana 
After being eliminated from the Concacaf Champions League by losing 2-1 on aggregate in April 2014, He went to hug a player from Cruz Azul but seconds later he shoved the player and shoved another player from the Cruz Azul and fought with one of the staff of Cruz Azul then also fought with one of the assistant managers of Cruz Azul. This was after the Cruz Azul goalkeeper, Jose De Jesus Corona was sent off at the end of the game

NorthEast United 
On July 1, 2015, he signed as the manager of Indian Super League club NorthEast United FC. He took the bottom placed team to the 5th position finish in the league, despite injury to some of his key players at the start of the tournament.

Bolivia 

He arrived in Bolivia in 2016 to manage The Strongest. Later he was appointed as caretaker coach of the team following Bolivia's failure to qualify for the 2018 FIFA World Cup. As a caretaker coach, he took an Asian tour, where he managed only one win over Myanmar 3–0, but also only suffered one minimal loss against Iran. After the tour, he returned to coach The Strongest.

After 2019 Copa América, in which Bolivia had a disappointing campaign with three straight defeats, Cesar was officially appointed as coach of Bolivia, with a given task to help Bolivia to qualify for 2022 FIFA World Cup. He is in charge of the U-23 team as well.

In his first major competition for Bolivia as coach, the 2020 CONMEBOL Pre-Olympic Tournament, the Bolivian team would have an outstanding performance in the tournament, including two shock wins over powerhouse Uruguay and Peru, but missed out on the place to the final round due to worse goal differences with the former.

Personal life
Farías's younger brother Daniel Farías was also a footballer.

Honours

Club
Nueva Cádiz
Venezuelan Segunda División: 1998

International
Venezuela U20
Copa Gobernación del Zulia: 2009
L'Alcúdia youth tournament: Runner-up 2009

Individual
2009 L'Alcúdia youth tournament: Best coach

References

1973 births
Living people
People from Cumaná
Venezuelan football managers
Trujillanos FC managers
Deportivo Táchira F.C. managers
Mineros de Guayana managers
Deportivo Anzoátegui managers
Venezuela national football team managers
Club Tijuana managers
NorthEast United FC head coaches
Cerro Porteño managers
The Strongest managers
Bolivia national football team managers
Venezuelan Segunda División managers
Venezuelan Primera División managers
Liga MX managers
Indian Super League head coaches
Paraguayan Primera División managers
Bolivian Primera División managers
2011 Copa América managers
Venezuelan expatriate football managers
Venezuelan expatriate sportspeople in Mexico
Venezuelan expatriate sportspeople in India
Venezuelan expatriate sportspeople in Paraguay
Venezuelan expatriate sportspeople in Bolivia
Expatriate football managers in Mexico
Expatriate football managers in India
Expatriate football managers in Paraguay
Expatriate football managers in Bolivia
NorthEast United FC managers
2021 Copa América managers
S.D. Aucas managers
Venezuelan expatriate sportspeople in Ecuador
Expatriate football managers in Ecuador